Pablo de la Guerra (29 November 1819 – 5 February  1874) was a Californio politician, judge, and signer of the Californian Constitution in 1849. He served as acting Lieutenant Governor of California and as a member of the California Senate.

Personal information
Pablo, a member of the Guerra family of California (a prominent Californio family), was born on 29 November 1819, in Santa Barbara, California.

Career
In 1838, Guerra became an Administrator. In 1849, he served as a delegate representing Santa Barbara District at the First California Constitutional Convention.

On 1 May 1851, he nearly resigned from the State Senate, but returned to the position which he held until 1861 when he became the leader of the senate, which led to his term as acting lieutenant governor.

From 1861-62, he served as the Acting Lieutenant Governor. From 1863-73 he was the District Judge for the 17th Judicial District.

Death
Pablo de la Guerra died 5 February 1874, aged 54, in Santa Barbara, California.

References

See also
Casa de la Guerra
José de la Guerra y Noriega
Pablo de la Guerra
Alfred Robinson - Anita de la Guerra de Noriega y Carrillo

Californios
1819 births
1874 deaths
People from Santa Barbara, California
Lieutenant Governors of California
Santa Barbara, California
19th-century American politicians
Democratic Party California state senators